Meat extenders are non-meat substances with substantial protein content. Extenders are distinguished from fillers by their high protein content, compared to the high carbohydrate content of fillers.

Extenders were originally used to reduce costs but they were later used to make meat products more healthy by adding dietary fiber, or to improve the texture. Meat extenders were used in the United States in the 1940s, with rolled oats used as an extender in sausage meat, and dishes such as stuffed cabbage were considered to be suitable ways of extending meat.

By the 1970s soy protein was commonly used as a meat extender.

See also

 List of meat substitutes
 Fillers

References

Food ingredients
Meat substitutes